Transylvania is a historical region in central and northwestern Romania. It was under the rule of the Agathyrsi, part of the Dacian Kingdom (168 BC–106 AD), Roman Dacia (106–271), the Goths, the Hunnic Empire (4th–5th centuries), the Kingdom of the Gepids (5th–6th centuries), the Avar Khaganate (6th–9th centuries), the Slavs, and the 9th century First Bulgarian Empire. During the late 9th century, Transylvania was reached and conquered by the Hungarian conquerors, and Gyula's family from seven chieftains of the Hungarians ruled Transylvania in the 10th century. King Stephen I of Hungary asserted his claim to rule all lands dominated by Hungarian lords, and he personally led his army against his maternal uncle Gyula III. Transylvania became part of the Kingdom of Hungary in 1002, and it belonged to the Lands of the Hungarian Crown until 1920.

After the Battle of Mohács in 1526 it belonged to the Eastern Hungarian Kingdom, from which the Principality of Transylvania emerged in 1570 by the Treaty of Speyer. During most of the 16th and 17th centuries, the principality was a vassal state of the Ottoman Empire; however, the principality had dual suzerainty (Ottoman and Habsburg kings of Hungary).

In 1690, the Habsburg dynasty claimed and gained possession of Transylvania through the historic rights of the Hungarian crown. After the failure Rákóczi's War of Independence in 1711 Habsburg control of Transylvania was consolidated, and Hungarian Transylvanian princes were replaced with Habsburg imperial governors. During the Hungarian Revolution of 1848, the Hungarian government proclaimed union with Transylvania in the April Laws of 1848. After the failure of the revolution, the March Constitution of Austria decreed that the Principality of Transylvania be a separate crown land entirely independent of Hungary. After the Austro-Hungarian Compromise of 1867, the separate status of Transylvania ceased, it was incorporated again into the Kingdom of Hungary (Transleithania) as part of the Austro-Hungarian Empire. After World War I, the National Assembly of Romanians from Transylvania proclaimed the Union of Transylvania with Romania on 1 December 1918. Transylvania became part of Kingdom of Romania by the Treaty of Trianon in 1920. In 1940, Northern Transylvania reverted to Hungary as a result of the Second Vienna Award, but it was returned to Romania after the end of World War II.

Due to its varied history the population of Transylvania is ethnically, linguistically, culturally and religiously diverse. From 1437 to 1848 political power in Transylvania was shared among the mostly Hungarian nobility, German burghers and the seats of the Székelys (a Hungarian ethnic group). The population consisted of Romanians, Hungarians (particularly Székelys) and Germans. The majority of the present population is Romanian, but large minorities (mainly Hungarian and Roma) preserve their traditions. However, as recently as the communist era ethnic-minority relations remained an issue of international contention. This has abated (but not disappeared) since the Revolution of 1989 restored democracy in Romania. Transylvania retains a significant Hungarian-speaking minority, slightly less than half of which identify themselves as Székely. Ethnic Germans in Transylvania (known as Saxons) comprise about one percent of the population; however, Austrian and German influences remain in the architecture and urban landscape of much of Transylvania.

The region's history may be traced through the religions of its inhabitants. For the first time in history, the Diet of Torda in 1568 declared freedom of religion. There was no state religion, while in other parts of Europe and the world religious wars were fought. The Roman Catholic, Lutheran, Calvinist, and Unitarian Churches and religions were declared to be fully equal, and the Romanian Orthodox religion was tolerated. Most Romanians in Transylvania belong to the Eastern Orthodox Church faith, but from the 18th to the 20th centuries the Romanian Greek-Catholic Church also had substantial influence. Hungarians primarily belong to the Roman Catholic or Reformed Churches; a smaller number are Unitarians. Of the ethnic Germans in Transylvania, the Saxons have primarily been Lutheran since the Reformation; however, the Danube Swabians are Catholic. The Baptist Union of Romania is the second-largest such body in Europe; Seventh-day Adventists are established, and other evangelical churches have been a growing presence since 1989. No Muslim communities remain from the era of the Ottoman invasions. As elsewhere, anti-Semitic 20th century politics saw Transylvania's once sizable Jewish population greatly reduced by the Holocaust and emigration.

Name of Transylvania 
The earliest known reference to Transylvania appears in a Medieval Latin document of the Kingdom of Hungary in 1075 as "ultra silvam", in the Gesta Hungarorum as "terra ultrasilvana", meaning "land beyond the forest" ("terra" means land, "ultra" means "beyond" or "on the far side of" and the accusative case of "silva", "silvam" means "woods, forest"). Transylvania, with an alternative Latin prepositional prefix, means "on the other side of the woods". The Hungarian form Erdély was first mentioned in the Gesta Hungarorum as "Erdeuelu". The Medieval Latin form "Ultrasylvania", later Transylvania, was a direct translation from the Hungarian form "Erdőelve" ("erdő" means "forest" and "elve" means "beyond" in old Hungarian). That also was used as an alternative name in German "Überwald" ("über" means "beyond" and "wald" means forest) in the 13th–14th centuries. The earliest known written occurrence of the Romanian name Ardeal appeared in a document in 1432 as "Ardeliu". The Romanian Ardeal is derived from the Hungarian Erdély. Erdelj in Serbian and Croatian, Erdel in Turkish were borrowed from this form as well.

According to the Romanian linguist Nicolae Drăganu, the Hungarian name of Transylvania evolved over time from Erdőelü, Erdőelv, Erdőel, Erdeel in chronicles and written charters from 1200 up to late 1300. In written sources from 1390, we can find also the form Erdel, which can be read also as Erdély. There is evidence for that in the written Wallachian Chancellery Charters expressed in Slavonic where the word appears as Erûdelû (1432), Ierûdel, Ardelîu (1432), ardelski (1460, 1472, 1478–1479, 1480, 1498, 1507–1508, 1508), erdelska, ardelska (1498). With the first texts written in Romanian (1513) the name Ardeal appears to be written.

Ancient history

Dacian states 

Herodotus gives an account of the Agathyrsi, who lived in Transylvania during the fifth century BCE. He described them as a luxurious people who enjoyed wearing gold ornaments. Herodotus also claimed that the Agathyrsi held their wives in common, so all men would be brothers.

A kingdom of Dacia existed at least as early as the early second century BCE under King Oroles. Under Burebista, the foremost king of Dacia and a contemporary of Julius Caesar, the kingdom reached its maximum extent. The area now constituting Transylvania was the political center of Dacia.

The Dacians are often mentioned by Augustus, according to whom they were compelled to recognize Roman supremacy. However, they were not subdued and in later times crossed the frozen Danube during winter and ravaging Roman cities in the recently acquired Roman province of Moesia.

The Dacians built several important fortified cities, among them Sarmizegetusa (near the present Hunedoara). They were divided into two classes: the aristocracy (tarabostes) and the common people (comati).

Roman-Dacian Wars 

The Roman Empire expansion in the Balkans brought the Dacians into open conflict with Rome. During the reign of Decebalus, the Dacians were engaged in several wars with the Romans from 85 to 89 CE. After two reverses the Romans gained an advantage but were obliged to make peace due to the defeat of Domitian by the Marcomanni. Domitian agreed to pay large sums (eight million sesterces) in annual tribute to the Dacians for maintaining peace.

In 101 the emperor Trajan began a military campaign against the Dacians, which included a siege of Sarmizegetusa Regia and the occupation of part of the country. The Romans prevailed but Decebalus was left as a client king under a Roman protectorate. Three years later, the Dacians rebelled and destroyed the Roman troops in Dacia. As a result, Trajan quickly began a new campaign against them (105–106). The battle for Sarmizegetusa Regia took place in the early summer of 106 with the participation of the II Adiutrix and IV Flavia Felix legions and a detachment (vexillatio) from the Legio VI Ferrata. The Dacians repelled the first attack, but the water pipes from the Dacian capital were destroyed. The city was set on fire, the pillars of the sacred sanctuaries were cut down and the fortification system was destroyed; however, the war continued. Through the treason of Bacilis (a confidant of the Dacian king), the Romans found Decebalus' treasure in the Strei River (estimated by Jerome Carcopino as 165,500 kg of gold and 331,000 kg of silver). The last battle with the army of the Dacian king took place at Porolissum (Moigrad).

Dacian culture encouraged its soldiers to not fear death, and it was said that they left for war merrier than for any other journey. In his retreat to the mountains, Decebalus was followed by Roman cavalry led by Tiberius Claudius Maximus. The Dacian religion of Zalmoxis permitted suicide as a last resort by those in pain and misery, and the Dacians who heard Decebalus' last speech dispersed and committed suicide. Only the king tried to retreat from the Romans, hoping that he could find in the mountains and forests the means to resume battle, but the Roman cavalry followed him closely. After they almost caught him, Decebalus committed suicide by slashing his throat with his sword (falx).

The history of the Dacian Wars was written by Cassius Dio, and they are also depicted on Trajan's Column in Rome.

Following the war, several parts of Dacia including Transylvania were organized into the Roman province of Dacia Traiana.

Roman Dacia 

The Romans brought most vestiges of the Roman culture into Dacia Traiana.

They sought to utilize the gold mines in the province and built access roads and forts (such as Abrud) to protect them. The region developed a strong infrastructure and an economy based on agriculture, cattle farming and mining. Colonists from Thracia, Moesia, Macedonia, Gaul, Syria and other Roman provinces were brought in to settle the land, developing cities like Apulum (now Alba Iulia) and Napoca (now Cluj Napoca) into  and colonias.

During the third century, increasing pressure from the Free Dacians and Visigoths forced the Romans to abandon Dacia Traiana.

According to historian Eutropius in Liber IX of his Breviarum, in 271, Roman citizens from Dacia Traiana were resettled by the Roman emperor Aurelian across the Danube in the newly established Dacia Aureliana, inside former Moesia Superior:

Middle Ages

Early Middle Ages: the great migrations

Goths 

Before their withdrawal the Romans negotiated an agreement with the Goths in which Dacia remained Roman territory, and a few Roman outposts remained north of the Danube. The Thervingi, a Visigothic tribe, settled in the southern part of Transylvania, and the Ostrogoths lived on the Pontic–Caspian steppe.

About 340, Ulfilas brought Acacian Arianism to the Goths in Guthiuda, and the Visigoths (and other Germanic tribes) became Arians.

The Gothic presence in the area of Transylvania starts in the second half of the 4th century and lasted for a few decades, at least until the Hunic invasion 

The Goths were able to defend their territory for about a century against the Gepids, Vandals and Sarmatians; however, the Visigoths were unable to preserve the region's Roman infrastructure. Transylvania's gold mines were unused during the Early Middle Ages.

Huns 

By 376 a new wave of migratory people, the Huns, led by Uldin defeated and expelled the Visigoths, setting up their own headquarters in what was Dacia Inferior. Hoping to find refuge from the Huns, Fritigern (a Visigothic leader) appealed to the Roman emperor Valens in 376 to be allowed to settle with his people on the south bank of the Danube. However, a famine broke out and Rome was unable to supply them with food or land. As a result, the Goths rebelled against the Romans for several years. The Huns fought the Alans, Vandals, and Quadi, forcing them toward the Roman Empire. Pannonia became the centre during the peak of Attila's reign (435–453).

Dating from 425 to 455, the Transylvanian traces of the Huns lie in the lowlands of the Mureș valley. The most important testimonies of the Hun rule are the two separate sets of coins discovered at Sebeș. Between the 420s and 455, Hun princes and lords established summer residences in Transylvania. The newest discoveries strengthens the theory that there was a more serious Hun military presence in Transylvania.

Spread of Christianity 

Sparse archeological findings from the 4th century (Biertan Donarium, a clay pot with Christain symbols from Moigrad, and another clay pot with Chi Rho monogram at the bottom from Ulpia Traiana for example) point at minor Christian communities isolated from the main group.

The Biertan Donarium was found in 1775. There are two theories on the origins of this artifact. According to the supporters of the Daco-Romanian continuity theory this donarium was made by the survivor Latin-speaking Christian population population of Dacia following the Aurelian Retreat. Those historians who are sceptic about this object point to the dubious circumstances of this finding. They emphasize that there were no Roman settlements or Christian churches near to Biertan. According to them this object was made in Aquileia in Northern Italy during the 4th century and it was carried into Transylvania as a loot by Gothic warriors or by trading. It is the most possible that the find from Biertan is a result of plundering in Illyricum or Pannonia or in the Balkans anytime between the fourth and the sixth century and this artifact was reused as a pagan object by its new owners. Originally it was intended to be hung from a candelabrum but the perforations made later indicate it was reused and attached to a coffer for storing vessels or other goods. According to this opinion even its usage for Christian purposes should be questioned in the territory of Transylvania.

It is only in the 5th century that the artefacts become more common, most of them in the form of oil lamps, gold rings with cross incisions (from the tomb of Omahar in Apahida), a chest piece with Christian symbols. From the 6th century, associated with the missionary work supported by Justinian I and confirmed by their Byzantine provenience, the oil lamps become even more common, accompanied by two ampullae with the representation of Saint Menas, and several moulds for cross shaped pendants.

In the context of Khan Boris I conversion to Christianity and the baptism of Bulgarians, the Byzantine type of church organization is identified in the region. Historian I. Baán, discussing the origin of Kalocsa archdiocese, pointed that the existence of two archdioceses in the early days of Kingdom of Hungary is connected with parallel work undertaken by missionaries from both the Eastern and the Western churches. He identifies archdiocese of Kalocsa with "archdiocese of Tourkia" and lists in its suborder the dioceses of Transylvania, Banat, and Cenad. The baptism of Gyula II in Constantinople and his accompaniment by bishop Hierotheos lead to the deduction that the diocese of Transylvania was established before 1018. From this reasoning a diocese of Transylvania, subordinated to the Patriarchate of Constantinople, could be dated to the time of Géza. His reasoning is sustained by the discovery in 2011 at Alba Iulia of a church built in Eastern tradition, and dated between the second half of the 10th century and first half of the 11th century. During the rule of Ahtum (baptised in Vidin) in Banat, towards the end of 10th century, a monastery of Eastern rite monks was active in Cenad.

Gepids 

After Attila's death, the Hunnic empire disintegrated. In 455 the Gepids (under king Ardarich) conquered Pannonia, allowing them to settle for two centuries in Transylvania. The Gepids secured their rule by attacking and ravaging their neighbors' territories and creating military border zones, while themselves remaining in Transylvania proper, surrounded by hard terrain. On one occasion in 539, cooperating with the Franks they crossed the Danube and devastated Moesia, killing magister millitum Calluc. They weren't this lucky with the Ostrogoths, who first routed the united forces of Gepids, Suebians, Scirians and Sarmatians at the Battle of Bolia, than at the Battle of Sirmium. King Thraustila lost the city and his successors failed to recapture even after Theodoric's death. After a long decline, Gepidia finally fell to the joint invasion of the Avars and Lombards in 567. Very few Gepid sites (such as cemeteries in the Banat region) after 600 remain; they were apparently assimilated by the Avar empire.

Avars, Slavs, Bulgars 

By 568 the Avars, under Khagan Bayan I established an empire in the Carpathian Basin that lasted for 250 years. Related peoples from the east arrived in the Avar Kaganate several times: around 595 the Kutrigurs, and then around 670 the Onogurs. During this period the Slavs were allowed to settle inside Transylvania. The Avars declined with the rise of Charlemagne's Frankish Empire. After a war between the khagan and Yugurrus from 796 to 803, the Avars were defeated. The Transylvanian Avars were subjugated by the Bulgars under Khan Krum at the beginning of the ninth century, after which the region was partially occupied by fleeing Slavs, who sought for protection from the Franks. Later, Southern Transylvania was conquered by the First Bulgarian Empire.  The downfall of the Avar Khaganate at the beginning of the 9th century did not mean the extinction of the Avar population, contemporary written sources report surviving Avar groups.

Hungarians 

The Hungarians arrived in the Carpathian Basin, in a geographically unified but politically divided land, after acquiring thorough local knowledge of the area from the 860s onwards. After the end of the Avar Kaganate (c. 822), the Eastern Franks asserted their influence in Transdanubia, the Bulgarians to a small extent in the Southern Transylvania and the interior regions housed the surviving Avar population in their stateless state. According to the archaeological evidence, the Avar population survived the time of the Hungarian conquest of the Carpathian Basin. In this power vacuum, The Hungarian conqueror elite took the system of the former Avar Kaganate, there is no trace of massacres and mass graves, it is believed to have been a peaceful transition for local residents in the Carpathian Basin.

In 862, Prince Rastislav of Moravia rebelled against the Franks, and after hiring Magyar troops, won his independence; this was the first time that Hungarians expeditionary troops entered the Carpathian Basin. In 862, Archbishop Hincmar of Reims records the campaign of unknown enemies called "Ungri", giving the first mention of the Hungarians in Western Europe. In 881, the Hungarian forces fought together with the Kabars in the Vienna Basin. According to historian György Szabados and archeologist Miklós Béla Szőke, a group of Hungarians were already living in the Carpathian Basin at that time, so they could quickly intervene in the events of the Carolingian Empire. The number of recorded battles increased from the end of the 9th century. In the late Avar period, a part of Hungarians was already present in the Carpathian Basin in the 9th century, this has been supported by genetic and archaeological research, because there are graves in which Avar descendants are buried in Hungarian clothes. An important segment of this Avar era Hungarians is that the Hungarian county system of King Saint Stephen I may be largely based on the power centers formed during the Avar period. Based on DNA evidence, the Proto-Hungarians admixed with Sarmatians and Huns, this three genetic components appear in the graves of the Hungarian conqueror elite of the 9th century. Based on the DNA in the Hungarian conqueror graves, the conquerors had eastern origin, but the vast majority of the Hungarian conquerors had European genome. The cemeteries of the Hungarian commoners had fewer Asian genomes than the cemeteries of the Hungarian elite. According to the genetic evidence, there is a genetic continuity from the Bronze Age, a continuous migration of the Steppe folks from east to the Carpathian Basin.

The Hungarians took possession of the Carpathian Basin in a pre-planned manner, with a long move-in between 862–895. According to eleventh-century tradition, the road taken by the Hungarians under Prince Álmos took them first to Transylvania in 895. This is supported by an eleventh-century Russian tradition that the Hungarians moved to the Carpathian Basin by way of Kiev. Prince Álmos, the sacred leader of the Hungarian Great Principality died before he could reach Pannonia, he was sacrificed in Transylvania. According to Romanian historian Florin Curta, no evidence exists of Magyars crossing Eastern Carpathian Mountains into Transylvania.

According to supporters of the Daco-Roman continuity theory, Transylvania was populated by Romanians at the time of the Hungarian conquest. Opponents of this theory assert that Transylvania was sparsely inhabited by peoples of Slavic origin and Turkic people The presence of Slavs is confirmed by archaeology, but no distinctive trace of Romanians had been found in Transylvania at the time of the Hungarian conquest.

The year of the conquest of Transylvania is unknown, the earliest Magyar artifacts found in the region date to the first half of the 10th century. The very typical feature of the Asian Hun and European Hun cemeteries is the partial horse burials, almost in all Hun graves there are only remain of horses. Outside the Huns, only the Hungarians used partial horse burials. This ancient tradition that went through centuries, it is easily identifiable in the Huns and Hungarians graves. Archeologists also found this kind of horse burial in Transylvania. During joint research, archaeologists from the University of Sibiu (Romania) and the University of Tübingen (Germany) excavated one of the most important Hungarian cemeteries from the time of the Hungarian conquest near Orăștie (Szászváros in Hungarian) in 2005. According to Romanian archeologist Marian Tiplic, the excavated graves refer to the second generation of Hungarian conquerors, the skeletons found here are the remains of the Gyula tribe. It was a permanent settlement, the location of which, on top of a hill, suggests that the goal of the Hungarian was to control the valley of the Mureș. A coin minted under Berthold, Duke of Bavaria (reign 938–947) found near Turda indicates that Transylvanian Magyars participated in western military campaigns. Although their defeat in the 955 Battle of Lechfeld ended Magyar raids against western Europe, raids on the Balkan Peninsula continued until 970. Linguistic evidence suggests that after their conquest, the Magyars inherited the local social structures of the conquered Pannonian Slavs; in Transylvania, there was intermarriage between the Magyar ruling class and the Slavic élite.

Gyula's family ruled Transylvania from around 925 onwards. Gyula II was a Hungarian tribal leader in the middle of the 10th century. His capital was Gyulafehérvár (now Alba Iulia in Romania). The Hungarian name Gyulafehérvár is meaning "White Castle of the Gyula", the Romanian name, Alba Iulia, is a Romanian language translation of this. Gyula II descended from a family whose members held the hereditary title gyula, which was the second in rank among the leaders of the Hungarian Great Principality. Ioannes Skylitzes narrates that around 952 Gyula II visited Constantinople, where he was baptized, and Emperor Constantine VII lifted him from the baptismal font. A bishop named Hierotheos accompanied Gyula II back to Hungary. Hierotheos was the first bishop of Transylvania. Gyula II built the first church of Transylvania in Gyulafehérvár (now Alba Iulia in Romania) around 950, the ruins of the church were discovered in 2011. Sarolt, daughter of Gyula II was married to Géza, Grand Prince of the Hungarians around 970. Their son Vajk was born around 975, who became the first king of Hungary in 1000 as King Stephen I of Hungary.

Medieval Gesta Hungarorum 

The enemies of the conquering Hungarians in the Gesta Hungarorum are not mentioned in other primary sources, consequently, historians debate whether Gelou, Glad, and Menumorut were a historical person or an imaginary figure created by Anonymus. Gelou is a figure in the Gesta Hungarorum (Latin for The Deeds of the Hungarians), а medieval work written by an author known as "Anonymus" in the Hungarian royal court probably at the end of the 12th century (about 300 years after the Hungarian conquest, which was around 895). In the Gesta Hungarorum Gelou ruled part of Transylvania, he was described as "a certain Vlach" (quidam blacus) and "prince of the Vlachs" (ducem blacorum), inhabited his land by "Vlachs and Slavs" (blasij et sclaui). He was said to be defeated by one of the seven Hungarian dukes, Töhötöm (Tuhutum in the original Latin, also known as Tétény). Hungarian historians assert that Gelou was created by the author from the name of the village of Gyalu (today's Gilău in Romania), a Transylvanian village in the Mountains of Gyalu (today's Gilău Mountains in Romania), where Gelou died in the Gesta Hungarorum. Hungarian historians identify the Blaks (Blasii, Blaci) people with the Bulaqs.

Glad was the ruler of Banat at the time of the Hungarian conquest of the Carpathian Basin according to the Gesta Hungarorum. Glad came from Vidin in Bulgaria, he occupied the land from the river Mureș up to the castle of Orşova and Palanka with the help of the Cumans. According to Anonymus, Glad commanded a great army of horsemen and foot soldiers and his army was supported by Cumans, Bulgarians and Vlachs (blacorum). The Hungarians sent an army against him and Glad was defeated, his army was annihilated, two dukes of the Cumans and three kneses of the Bulgarians were slain in the battle. Hungarian historiography regards him as fictitious, along with many other imaginary enemy characters in the Gesta Hungarorum, he is also not mentioned in other primary sources. Anonymus's reference to the Cumans supporting Glad is one of the key points in the scholarly debate, because the Cumans did not arrive in Europe before the 1050s. In Romanian historiography, Glad is described as one of "the three Romanian dukes" who ruled the regions of present-day Romania in the early 10th century.

Menumorut was the ruler of the lands between the rivers Mureș, Someș and Tisza at the time of the Hungarian conquest of the Carpathian Basin around 900. According to the Gesta Hungarorum, Menumorut's duchy was populated primarily with Khazars and Székelys, and he acknowledged the suzerainty of the ruling Byzantine Emperor at the time. According to Anonymus, Menumorut communicated "haughtily with a Bulgarian heart".

According to the Gesta Hungarorum, the Hungarians besieged and seized Menumorut's fortress at Biharia which caused him to apologise for his Bulgar sympathies and offered his daughter in marriage to Zoltán, the son of Árpád, the Grand Prince of the Hungarians. The chronicle states that Menumorut died without a son before 907 and left his whole kingdom in peace to Zoltán, his son-in-law.

Ajtony was an early-11th-century ruler in the territory now known as Banat, According to the Gesta Hungarorum, he was a descendant of Glad. He taxed salt which was transferred to King Stephen I of Hungary on the Mureș River. The Hungarian king sent Csanád, Ajtony's former commander-in-chief, against him at the head of a large royal army. Csanád defeated and killed Ajtony, Csanád County and its capital Csanád (today's Cenad in Romania) were named after him.

Daco-Roman continuity theory 

Conflicting theories exist concerning whether or not the Romanians are a Romanized Dacian population that, surviving the Migration Period remained in Transylvania after the withdrawal of the Romans.

As part of the medieval Kingdom of Hungary

High Middle Ages 

In 1000 Stephen I of Hungary, grand prince of the Hungarian tribes, was recognised by the Pope and by his brother-in-law Henry II, Holy Roman Emperor as king of Hungary. Although Stephen was raised as a Roman Catholic and Christianization of the Hungarians was achieved mostly by Rome, he also recognized and supported orthodoxy. Attempts by Stephen to control all Hungarian tribal territories led to wars, including one with his maternal uncle Gyula (a chieftain in Transylvania; Gyula was the second-highest title in the Hungarian tribal confederation). In 1002, Stephen led an army into Transylvania and Gyula surrendered without a fight. This made possible the organization of the Transylvanian Catholic episcopacy (with Gyulafehérvár as its seat), which was finished in 1009 when the bishop of Ostia (as papal legate) visited Stephen and they approved diocesan divisions and boundaries.

According to the Chronicon Pictum, King Stephen I of Hungary defeated Kean, a ruler of Bulgarians and Slavs in southern Transylvania.

Medieval Transylvania was an integral part of the Kingdom of Hungary; however, it was an administratively distinct unit. The medieval Kingdom of Hungary was not divided into provinces, although at the beginning of the 14th century its kings bore a long title that included the names of nine countries and provinces – "By the grace of God, King of Hungary, Dalmatia, Croatia, Rama, Serbia, Galicia, Lodomeria, Cumania and Bulgaria". However, the majority of addresses were demand addresses. Actual rule was only exercised over Croatia and Dalmatia, where the Hungarian authority was represented by the bans placed at the head of the provinces. Within the country - due to their great distance from the center - only two separate territorial governments were established, which are sometimes mentioned as a country (regnum) in the sources, but were never included among the titles of the Hungarian kings: Transylvania along the eastern borders and Slavonia south of the Drava.

The first recorded Pecheneg invasion of Transylvania occurred during the reign of Stephen I of Hungary. The Battle of Kerlés, was an engagement between an army of Pechenegs and Ouzes commanded by Osul and the troops of King Solomon of Hungary and his cousins, Dukes Géza and Ladislaus, in Transylvania in 1068.

Of the known Hungarian documents drafted before 1200, only twenty-seven bear some reference to Transylvania; two date from the 11th, the rest from the 12th century. Of the latter, sixteen reveal only the name of some Transylvanian, religious or lay dignitary, such as a bishop, a dean, a voivode, or a count. In the 13th century, and particularly after 1250, the number of documents touching on Transylvania grows rapidly and reaches over four hundred.

Székelys 

The Székelys have historically claimed descent from Attila's Huns. Hungarian medieval chronicles recount that a contingent of Huns remained in Transylvania, later allying with the returning Hungarians they conquered the Carpathian Basin together in the 9th century. Several medieval Hungarian chronicles claimed that the Székely people descended from Huns:

In the Middle Ages, the Székelys played a role in the defense of the Kingdom of Hungary against the Ottomans in their posture as guards of the eastern border. Nicolaus Olahus stated in the book Hungaria et Athila in 1536 that "Hungarians and Székelys share the same language, with the difference that the Székelys have their own words specific to their nation."

Saxons 

In the 12th and 13th centuries, the areas in the south and northeast were settled by German colonists known as Saxons. Tradition holds that Siebenbürgen, the German name for Transylvania, derives from the seven principal fortified towns founded by these Transylvanian Saxons.

The first German settlers called in by Géza II in around 1160 came from the Rhineland and established their villages between the Olt and Küküllő rivers. Around the same time north of them, German "guests" (hospites) arrived to the kingly estates in Radna and Beszterce. The colonization was organized by the Gräves (de) or gerébs (hu). Some gerébs received judicial, administrative, martial positions. These titles later became hereditary.

Already in the 13th century, Transylvanian Saxony was divided into seats mirroring the Székelys. The basis of the Transylvanian German administration was laid by Andrew II in his 1224 diploma "Andreanum". He ceased the supervision of the voivode and gave the job (called "royal judge" (királybíró) from then on) to the ispán of Szeben. The municipal privileges enabling local priest and judge elections, that the Saxon seats and villages received came to be known as "Szeben freedom" (szebeni szabadság). The area of the Beszterce river could also enjoy the "Szeben freedom" from 1366 on. The Saxons only had to pay tax to the king. This was every year on St. Martin's Day, 11 November. Furthermore, 500 German armored soldiers were recruited into the Hungarian army. The recruitment and training was managed by the Saxon count, the second most powerful Saxon lord in the colony.

As the society evolved, the Saxon middle class discriminated the gerébs who largely assimilated into the Hungarian nobility. The now leaderless communities became either craftmen or independent peasants. The markets where they sold their products became towns. A new class also emerged: the merchant citizenry. Their towns gained the right to tax cargoes, containing expensive eastern goods. As the Saxons now preferred hiring mercenaries rather than recruiting from their own folk, the count post, now functioning more of an economist, was taken over by the mayor of Szeben. The mayor was chosen by an urban council of 12 persons who came from a council of 100 persons. Ergo, the Saxon society's most powerful officials were the royal judge and the mayor, both from Szeben.

The ecclesia of Transylvanian Saxony was very divided. Some counties in the southern part were attached to the provostship of Szeben, others to the bishopric of Gyulafehérvár.

Teutonic Knights 
The German influence became more marked when, in 1211, King Andrew II of Hungary called on the Teutonic Knights to protect Transylvania in the Burzenland from the Cumans. After the order strengthened its grip on the territory and expanded it beyond Transylvania without authorisation, Andrew expelled the Knights in 1225.

"Voivod" (end 12th-13th century) 

Administration in Transylvania was at the hands of a voivod appointed by the king (the word voivod, or voievod, first appeared in 1193). Before then, the word ispán was used for the chief official of Alba County. Transylvania came under voivod rule after 1263, when the duties of the Counts of Szolnok (Doboka) and Alba were eliminated. The voivod controlled seven comitatus. According to the Chronicon Pictum, Transylvania's first voivod was Zoltán of Transylvania, the same person as Zolta, great-grandfather of Saint Stephen. This is debated by modern historians, as in the Middle Ages a person couldn't live for so long and be capable to perform such an important position; however, it is not questioned that Zoltán was the relative of the king, maybe his brother.

Mongol invasions 

In 1241, Transylvania suffered during the Mongol invasion of Europe. Güyük Khan invaded Transylvania from the Oituz (Ojtoz) Pass, while Subutai attacked in the south from the Mehedia Pass towards Orșova. While Subutai advanced northward to meet Batu Khan, Güyük attacked Hermannstadt/Nagyszeben (Sibiu) to prevent the Transylvanian nobility from aiding King Béla IV of Hungary. Beszterce, Kolozsvár and the Transylvanian Plain region were ravaged by the Mongols, in addition to the Hungarian king's silver mine at Óradna. A separate Mongol force destroyed the western Cumans near the Siret River in the Carpathians and annihilated the Cuman bishopric of Milcov. Estimates of population decline in Transylvania due to the Mongol invasion range from 15 to 50 percent.

The Cumans converted to Roman Catholicism and, after their defeat by the Mongols, sought refuge in central Hungary; Elizabeth the Cuman (1244–1290), known as Erzsébet in Hungarian, a Cuman princess, married Stephen V of Hungary in 1254.

In 1285, Nogai Khan with Talabuga led the invasion of Hungary. Talabuga led an army in northern Hungary but was stopped by heavy Carpathian snow; he was defeated near Pest by the royal army of Ladislaus IV and ambushed by the Székelys in retreat. Talabuga's army ravaged Transylvania; cities such as Reghin, Brașov and Bistrița were plundered. Still, the invaders suffered from lack of food, being also confronted with the resistance of the local people, Székelys, Romanians and Saxons.

Benedict, abbot of the church Szent Tamás of Esztergom, wrote regarding the Mongol invasion of 1285: "26,000 Tatars were killed in the Kingdom of Hungary, so the Tatars fled, trying to save themselves from the hands of the Hungarians, they reached Transylvania, but the Székelys, Vlachs and Saxons blocked the roads with their scouts and surrounded them...". Iohannes Longus de Ypre, Marino Sanuto Torsello recorded that in the Mongol invasion the passes of the Carpathians were defended together by the Romanians and the Székelys: "However, the remnants of the Tatars returned to Cumania, after their retreat, the nations of Pannonia, the Vlachs and the Székelys, who live in the Zipheos [Carpathian] mountains, which the Hungarians call forests [Transylvania], closed those passes in such a way that the Tatars could no longer cross them."

In 1288, the archbishop of Strigonius, Lodomerius, the most important Catholic church figure from Hungary, wrote an epistle "to the Hungarian, Saxon, Szeklely and Romanian nobles from the counties of Sibiu and Borsa in Transylvania", bringing serious charges against King Ladislaus IV and demanding them to no longer obey the sovereign and offer military aid against him.

Documented Romanian presence 
The oldest extant documents from Transylvania, dating from the 12th and 13th centuries, make passing references to both Hungarians and Vlachs.

The first appearance of a Romanian name (Ola) in Hungary appears in a 1258 charter. The first written sources of Romanian settlements date to the 13th century; the first cited Romanian township was Olahteluk (1283) in Bihar County. The "land of Vlachs" (Terram Blacorum)  appeared in Fogaras, and its area was mentioned under the name "Olachi" in 1285.

In the spring of 1291, in Alba Iulia, King Andrew III, the last from the Arpadian dynasty, convened and presided over an assembly consisting of the representatives of "all nobles, Saxons, Szeklers and Romanians" (cum universis Nobilibus, Saxonibus, Syculis et Olachis). This was the general congregation of all the privileged groups in Transylvania (the Hungarian nobles, the Saxons, the Szeklers and the Romanians), held about six months after the General Assembly of the Kingdom of Hungary, unfold at Buda.

In 1293 Andrew requested in a diploma the counting of the "Olacos" (Vlach) families in Hungary to relocate them to his "predium" (estate) called Székes. They numbered 3600 families (around 17.000 persons) according to the estimate.

Vlach law 

The Vlach law was a set of laws regulating the way of life and farming of the Central European and Balkan peoples practicing transhumance pastoralism. It has been also introduced in the Kingdom of Hungary, thus affecting Transylvania. Villages with Vlach law arose in the Kingdom of Hungary between the 13th and 16th centuries.

Its essential elements were the unique taxation methods. As the law had a more freedom of degree of taxation, it was favoring the immigration of foreigners. Due to the settlement activities of the kenezes, they were first established in Transylvania, and then in other parts of the Kingdom of Hungary, primarily in mountainous areas.

Contrary to the name of this law, not only the Romanians (Vlachs), but also other peoples, mainly the Ruthenians, were entitled to this right. Vlach law is closely related to the institution of keneziatus. A kenez was the hereditary leader of the Vlach communities, primarily in the medieval Kingdom of Hungary. Official documents, written in Latin, applied multiple terms when they mentioned the Vlach leaders (or chiefs) in the Kingdom of Hungary in the 13th and 14th centuries. There were kenezes with 300 families, but also ones with barely four or five families. Initially, they settled in the vicinity of existing villages, but from the middle of the 14th century, they also founded independent settlements. These peoples had their own legal customs, the basis of which was the obligation to give the landlord a certain number of animals each year. This way of life was also adopted by a part of the Ruthenian population of today's Transcarpathia from the 14th century.

Power system: the "estates" (12th-14th century) 

The three most important 14th-century dignitaries were the voivod, the Bishop of Transylvania and the Abbot of Kolozsmonostor (on the outskirts of present-day Cluj-Napoca).

Transylvania was organized according to the estate system. Its estates were privileged groups, or universitates (the central power acknowledged some collective freedoms), with socio-economic and political power; they were also organized using ethnic criteria.

As in the rest of the Hungarian kingdom, the first estate was the aristocracy (lay and ecclesiastic): ethnically heterogeneous, but undergoing homogenization around its Hungarian nucleus. The document granting privileges to the aristocracy was the Golden Bull of 1222, issued by King Andrew II. The other estates were the Saxons, Szeklers and Romanians, all with an ethno-linguistic basis. The Saxons, who had settled in southern Transylvania in the 12th and 13th centuries, were granted privileges in 1224 by the Diploma Andreanum. The Szeklers and Romanians were granted partial privileges. While the Szeklers consolidated their privileges, extending them to the entire ethnic group, the Romanians had difficulty retaining their privileges in certain areas (terrae Vlachorum or districtus Valachicales) and lost their estate rank. Nevertheless, when the king (or the voivod) summoned the general assembly of Transylvania (congregatio) during the 13th and 14th centuries it was attended by the four estates: noblemen, Saxons, Szeklers and Romanians (Universis nobilibus, Saxonibus, Syculis et Olachis in partibus Transiluanis).

Later Middle Ages 

King Louis I dispatched Andrew Lackfi, Count of the Székelys to invade the lands of the Golden Horde in retaliation for the Tatars' earlier plundering raids against Transylvania and the Szepesség. Lackfi and his army of mainly Székely warriors inflicted a defeat on a large Tatar army on 2 February 1345. The Golden Horde was pushed back behind the Dniester River, thereafter the Golden Horde's control of the lands between the Eastern Carpathians and the Black Sea weakened.

Romanian loss of status (1366-19th century) 
According to Romanian historian Pop, Romanians no longer had the right to participate in political power. Being gradually reduced to the state of the peasantry. The rich Romanians, Romanian nobility, Romanian knights and landowners, in order to maintain their rights and continue their hold on power, converted to the Catholicism and adopted the Hungarian customs. From the 16th century, the nobility becomes synonymous with Hungarianness. The Romanian nobles who continued and participated in power broke away from their mass of their people, whom they ceased to represent.

In 1437 Hungarian and Romanian peasants, the petty nobility and burghers from Kolozsvár (Klausenburg, now Cluj), under Antal Nagy de Buda, rose against their feudal masters and proclaimed their own estate (universitas hungarorum et valachorum, "the estate of Hungarians and Romanians"). To suppress the revolt the Hungarian nobility in Transylvania, the Saxon burghers and the Székelys formed the Unio Trium Nationum (Union of the Three Nations): a mutual-aid alliance against the peasants, pledging to defend their privileges against any power except that of Hungary's king. By 1438, the rebellion was crushed. From 1438 onwards the political system was based on the Unio Trium Nationum, and society was regulated by these three estates: the nobility (mostly Hungarians), the Székely and Saxon burghers. These estates, however, were more social and religious than ethnic divisions. Directed against the peasants, the Union limited the number of estates (excluding the Orthodox from political and social life in Transylvania): "The privileges define the status of the three recognized nations – the Hungarians, the Siculi and the Saxons – and the four churches – Lutheran, Calvinist, Unitarian and Catholic. The exclusion concerns the Romanian community and its Orthodox Church, a community that accounts for at least 50% of the population in the mid-eighteenth century."

Ottoman threat and John Hunyadi 

After a diversionary manoeuvre led by Sultan Murad II it was clear that the goal of the Ottomans was not to consolidate their grip on the Balkans and intimidate the Hungarians, but to conquer Hungary.

A key figure in Transylvania at this time was John Hunyadi (c. 1387 or 1400–1456). Hunyadi was awarded a number of estates (becoming one of the foremost landowners in Hungarian history) and a seat on the royal council for his service to Sigismund of Luxemburg. After supporting the candidature of Ladislaus III of Poland for the Hungarian throne, he was rewarded in 1440 with the captaincy of the fortress of Nándorfehérvár (Belgrade) and the voivodship of Transylvania (with his fellow voivod Miklos Újlaki). His subsequent military exploits (he is considered one of the foremost generals of the Middle Ages) against the Ottoman Empire brought him further status as the regent of Hungary in 1446 and papal recognition as the Prince of Transylvania in 1448.

Sultan Murad II proclaimed a raid into Transylvania, John Hunyadi defeated the raiding Ottoman army at the Battle of Hermannstadt in 1442. John Hunyadi and his 15,000 men defeated the 80,000-strong army of Begler Bey Sehabeddin at Zajkány (today's Zeicani), near the Iron Gate of the Danube river in 1442.

The Battle of Breadfield was the most tremendous conflict fought in Transylvania up to that time in the Ottoman–Hungarian Wars, taking place in 1479 during the reign of King Matthias Corvinus. The Hungarian army defeated a highly outnumbered Ottoman army and the Ottoman casualties were extremely high. The battle was the most significant victory for the Hungarians against the raiding Ottomans, and as a result, the Ottomans did not attack southern Hungary and Transylvania for many years thereafter.

Early modern period

Principality of Transylvania 

When the main Hungarian army and King Louis II Jagiello were slain by the Ottomans in the 1526 Battle of Mohács, John Zápolya—voivod of Transylvania, who opposed the succession of Ferdinand of Austria (later Emperor Ferdinand I) to the Hungarian throne—took advantage of his military strength. When John I was elected king of Hungary, another party recognized Ferdinand. In the ensuing struggle Zápolya was supported by Sultan Suleiman I, who (after Zápolya's death in 1540) overran central Hungary to protect Zápolya's son John II. John Zápolya founded the Eastern Hungarian Kingdom (1538–1570), from which the Principality of Transylvania arose. The principality was created after the signing the Treaty of Speyer in 1570 by king John II and emperor Maximiliam II, thus John Sigismund Zápolya, the Eastern Hungarian king became the first prince of Transylvania. According to the treaty, the Principality of Transylvania nominally remained part of the Kingdom of Hungary in the sense of public law. The Treaty of Speyer stressed in a highly significant way that John Sigismund's possessions belonged to the Holy Crown of Hungary and he was not permitted to alienate them.

Habsburgs controlled Royal Hungary, which comprised counties along the Austrian border, Upper Hungary and some of northwestern Croatia. The Ottomans annexed central and southern Hungary.

Transylvania became a semi-independent state under the Ottoman Empire (the Principality of Transylvania), where Hungarian princes who paid the Turks tribute enjoyed relative autonomy, and Austrian and Turkish influences vied for supremacy for nearly two centuries. It was now beyond the reach of Catholic religious authority, allowing Lutheran and Calvinist preaching to flourish. In 1563 Giorgio Blandrata was appointed court physician; his radical religious ideas influenced young King John II and Calvinist bishop Francis David, eventually converting both to Unitarianism. Francis David prevailed over Calvinist Peter Melius in 1568 in a public debate, resulting in individual freedom of religious expression under the Edict of Turda (the first such legal guarantee of religious freedom in Christian Europe). Lutherans, Calvinists, Unitarians and Roman Catholics received protection, while the majority Eastern Orthodox Church was tolerated.

Transylvania was governed by princes and its Diet (parliament). The Transylvanian Diet consisted of three estates: the Hungarian elite (largely ethnic Hungarian nobility and clergy), Saxon leaders (German burghers) and the free Székely Hungarians.

The Báthory family, which assumed power at the death of John II in 1571, ruled Transylvania as princes under the Ottomans (and briefly under Habsburg suzerainty) until 1602. The younger Stephen Báthory, a Hungarian Catholic who later became King Stephen Báthory of Poland, tried to maintain the religious liberty granted by the Edict of Turda but interpreted this obligation in an increasingly restricted sense. Under Sigismund Báthory, Transylvania entered the Long War, which began as a Christian alliance against the Turks and became a four-sided conflict in Transylvania involving the Transylvanians, Habsburgs, Ottomans and the Romanian voivod of Wallachia led by Michael the Brave.

Michael gained control of Transylvania (supported by the Szeklers) in October 1599 after the Battle of Șelimbăr, in which he defeated Andrew Báthory's army. Báthory was killed by Szeklers who hoped to regain their old privileges with Michael's help. In May 1600 Michael gained control of Moldavia, thus he became the leader of the three principalities of Wallachia, Moldavia and Transylvania (the three major regions of modern Romania). Michael installed Wallachian boyars in certain offices but did not interfere with the estates and sought support from the Hungarian nobility. In 1600 he was defeated by Giorgio Basta (Captain of Upper Hungary) and lost his Moldavian holdings to the Poles. After presenting his case to Rudolf II in Prague (capital of Germany), Michael was rewarded for his service. He returned, assisting Giorgio Basta in the Battle of Guruslău in 1601.
Michael's rule did not last long, however; he was assassinated by Walloon mercenaries under the command of Habsburg general Basta in August 1601. Michael's rule was marred by the pillaging of Wallachian and Serbian mercenaries and Székelys avenging the Szárhegy Bloody Carnival of 1596. When he entered Transylvania he did not grant rights to the Romanian inhabitants. Instead, Michael supported the Hungarian, Szekler, and Saxon nobles by reaffirming their rights and privileges.

After his defeat at Miriszló, the Transylvanian estates swore allegiance to the Habsburg emperor Rudolph. Basta subdued Transylvania in 1604, initiating a reign of terror in which he was authorised to appropriate land belonging to noblemen, Germanize the population and reclaim the principality for Catholicism in the Counter-Reformation. The period between 1601 (the assassination of Michael the Brave) and 1604 (the fall of Basta) was the most difficult for Transylvania since the Mongol invasion. "Misericordia dei quod non-consumti sumus" ("only God's mercy saves us from annihilation") characterised this period, according to an anonymous Saxon writer.

From 1604 to 1606, the Calvinist Bihar magnate István Bocskay led a successful rebellion against Habsburg rule. Bocskay was elected Prince of Transylvania April 5, 1603, and Prince of Hungary two months later. The two major achievements of Bocskay's brief reign (he died December 29, 1606) were the Peace of Vienna (June 23, 1606) and the Peace of Zsitvatorok (November 1606). With the Peace of Vienna Bocskay obtained religious liberty, the restoration of all confiscated estates, repeal of all "unrighteous" judgments, full retroactive amnesty for all Hungarians in Royal Hungary and recognition as independent sovereign prince of an enlarged Transylvania. Almost-equally important was the twenty-year Peace of Zsitvatorok, negotiated by Bocskay between Sultan Ahmed I and Rudolf II.

Gabriel Bethlen (who reigned from 1613 to 1629) thwarted all efforts of the emperor to oppress (or circumvent) his subjects, and won a reputation abroad by championing the Protestant cause. He waged war on the emperor three times, was proclaimed King of Hungary twice and obtained a confirmation of the Treaty of Vienna for the Protestants (and seven additional counties in northern Hungary for himself) in the Peace of Nikolsburg signed December 31, 1621. Bethlen's successor, George I Rákóczi, was equally successful. His principal achievement was the Peace of Linz (September 16, 1645), the last political triumph of Hungarian Protestantism, in which the emperor was forced to reconfirm the articles of the Peace of Vienna. Gabriel Bethlen and George I Rákóczi aided education and culture, and their reign has been called the golden era of Transylvania. They lavished money on their capital Alba Iulia (Gyulafehérvár or Weißenburg), which became the main bulwark of Protestantism in Central Europe. During their reign, Transylvania was one of the few European countries where Roman Catholics, Calvinists, Lutherans and Unitarians lived in mutual tolerance—all officially accepted religions (religiones recaepte). The Orthodox, however, still had inferior status.

This golden age (and relative independence) of Transylvania ended with the reign of George II Rákóczi. The prince, coveting the Polish crown, allied with Sweden and invaded Poland in 1657 despite the Ottoman Porte's prohibition of military action. Rákóczi was defeated in Poland and his army taken hostage by the Tatars. Chaotic years followed, with a quick succession of princes fighting one another and Rákóczi unwilling to resign, despite the Turkish threat of military attack. To resolve the political situation, the Turks resorted to military might; invasions of Transylvania with their Crimean Tatar allies, the ensuing loss of territory (particularly their primary Transylvanian stronghold, Várad, in 1660) and diminished manpower led to Prince John Kemény proclaiming the secession of Transylvania from the Ottomans in April 1661 and appealing for help to Vienna. A secret Habsburg-Ottoman agreement, however, prevented the Habsburgs from intervening; Kemény's defeat by the Turks (and the Turkish installation of the weak Mihály Apafi on the throne) marked the subordination of Transylvania, now a client state of the Ottoman Empire.

Habsburg rule 

After the defeat of the Ottomans at the Battle of Vienna in 1683, the Habsburgs began to impose their rule on Transylvania. In addition to strengthening the central government and administration, they promoted the Roman Catholic Church as a uniting force and to weaken the influence of Protestant nobility. By creating a conflict between Protestants and Catholics, the Habsburgs hoped to weaken the estates. They also attempted to persuade Orthodox clergymen to join the Uniate (Greek Catholic) Church, which accepted four key points of Catholic doctrine and acknowledged papal authority while retaining Orthodox rituals and traditions. Emperor Leopold I decreed Transylvania's Eastern Orthodox Church in union with the Roman Catholic Church by joining the newly created Romanian Greek-Catholic Church. Some priests converted, although the similarity between the two denominations was unclear to many. In response to the Habsburg policy of converting all Romanian Orthodox to Greek-Catholics, several peaceful movements within the Romanian Orthodox population advocated freedom of worship for all Transylvanians; notable leaders were Visarion Sarai, Nicolae Oprea Miclăuș and Sofronie of Cioara.

From 1711 onward, Habsburg control over Transylvania was consolidated and Transylvanian princes were replaced with Habsburg imperial governors. In 1765 the Grand Principality of Transylvania was proclaimed, consolidating the separate status of Transylvania within the Habsburg monarchy established by the 1691 Diploma Leopoldinum. This was a formality.

On November 2, 1784, a revolt detonated by Romanian peasant leaders Horea, Cloșca and Crișan began in Hunyad County and spread throughout the Apuseni Mountains. The insurgents' main demands were related to feudal serfdom and the lack of political equality between Romanians and other Transylvanian ethnic groups. They fought at Topánfalva (Topesdorf/Câmpeni), Abrudbánya (Großschlatten/Abrud) and Verespatak (Goldbach/Roșia), defeating the Habsburg Imperial Army at Brád (Tannenhof/Brad) on November 27, 1784. The revolt was crushed on February 28, 1785, at Dealul Furcilor (Forks Hill), Alba-Iulia, when the leaders were apprehended. Horea and Cloșca were executed by breaking on the wheel; Crișan hanged himself the night before his execution.

In 1791 the Romanians petitioned Emperor Leopold II for religious equality and recognition as a fourth "nation" in Transylvania (Supplex Libellus Valachorum). The Transylvanian Diet rejected their demands, restoring the Romanians to their marginalised status.

Late modern period

Revolutions of 1848 

In early 1848, the Hungarian Diet took the opportunity presented by revolution to enact a comprehensive program of legislative reform (the April laws), which included a provision for the union of Transylvania and Hungary. Transylvanian Romanians initially welcomed the revolution, believing they would benefit from the reforms. However, their position changed due to the opposition of Transylvanian nobles to the Hungarian reforms (such as emancipation of the serfs) and the failure of Hungarian revolutionary leaders to recognise Romanian national interests. In mid-May a Romanian diet at Balázsfalva produced its own revolutionary program, calling for proportional representation of Romanians in the Transylvanian Diet and an end to social and ethnic oppression. The Saxons were concerned about union with Hungary, fearing the loss of their traditional medieval origin privileges. When the Transylvanian Diet met on May 29, the vote for union was pushed through despite objections from many Saxon deputies. On June 10, the Emperor sanctioned the union vote of the Diet. Military executions and the arrest of revolutionary leaders after the union hardened the Saxons' position. In September 1848, another Romanian assembly in Balázsfalva (Blaj) denounced the union with Hungary and called for an armed uprising in Transylvania. War broke out in November, with Romanian and Saxon troops (under Austrian command) battling Hungarians led by Polish general Józef Bem. Within four months, Bem had ousted the Austrians from Transylvania. However, in June 1849 Tsar Nicholas I of Russia responded to an appeal from Emperor Franz Joseph to send Russian troops into Transylvania. After initial successes against the Russians, Bem's army was defeated decisively at the Battle of Temesvár (Timișoara) on August 9; the surrender of Hungary followed.

The Austrians clearly rejected the October demand that ethnic criteria become the basis for internal borders, with the goal of creating a province for Romanians (Transylvania, alongside Banat and Bukovina); they did not want to replace the threat of Hungarian nationalism with a potential one of Romanian separatism. However, they did not declare themselves hostile to the creation of Romanian administrative offices in Transylvania (which prevented Hungary from including the region in all but name). The territory was organized into  (prefectures), with Avram Iancu and Buteanu two prefects in the Apuseni Mountains. Iancu's prefecture, the Auraria Gemina (a name charged with Latin symbolism), became important; it took over from bordering areas which were never fully organized.

Administrative efforts were then halted as Hungarians, under Józef Bem, carried out an offensive through Transylvania. With the covert assistance of Imperial Russian troops, the Austrian army (except for garrisons at Gyulafehérvár and Déva) and the Austrian-Romanian administration retreated to Wallachia and Wallachian Oltenia (both were under Russian occupation). The last remaining resistance force was that of Avram Iancu: he retreated to harsh terrain, mounting a guerrilla campaign on Bem's forces, causing severe damage and blocking the route to Gyulafehérvár (Alba Iulia). He was, however, challenged by severe shortages: the Romanians had few guns and very little gunpowder. The conflict dragged on for several months, with all Hungarian attempts to seize the mountain stronghold repulsed.

In April 1849, Iancu was approached by Hungarian envoy Ioan Dragoș (a Romanian deputy in the Hungarian Parliament). Dragoș was apparently acting from a desire for peace, and he worked to have Romanian leaders meet him in Abrudbánya (today Abrud) and listen to the Hungarian demands. Iancu's adversary, Hungarian commander Imre Hatvany, seems to have exploited the provisional armistice to attack the Romanians in Abrudbánya. However, Iancu and his men retreated and encircled him.

Hatvany angered the Romanians by having Buteanu captured and murdered. As his position became weaker, he was attacked by Iancu's men until his defeat on May 22. Hatvany and most of his armed group were massacred by their adversaries; Iancu captured their cannons, switching the tactical advantage for the next several months. Lajos Kossuth was angered by Hatvany's gesture (an inspection at the time dismissed all of Hatvany's close collaborators), since it made future negotiations unlikely.

However, the conflict became less harsh: Iancu's men concentrated on seizing local resources and supplies, opting to inflict losses only through skirmishes. The Russian intervention in June precipitated an escalation, since the Poles fighting in the Hungarian revolutionary contingents wanted to resist the Tsarist armies. Henryk Dembiński, a Polish general, negotiated for a truce between Kossuth and the Wallachian émigré revolutionaries. The latter, who were close to Iancu (especially Nicolae Bălcescu, Gheorghe Magheru, Alexandru G. Golescu, and Ion Ghica) wanted to defeat the Russian armies that had crushed their movement in September 1848.

Bălcescu and Kossuth met in May 1849 at Debrecen. The contact has long been celebrated by Romanian Marxist historians and politicians. Karl Marx's condemnation of everything opposing Kossuth led to any Romanian initiative being automatically considered "reactionary". The agreement was not a pact: Kossuth flattered the Wallachians, encouraging them to persuade Iancu's armies leaving Transylvania to help Bălcescu in Bucharest. While agreeing to mediate for peace, Bălcescu never presented these terms to the fighters in the Apuseni Mountains. All Iancu agreed to was the neutrality of his forces in the conflict between Russia and Hungary. Thus, he secured his position as the Hungarian armies suffered defeats in July (culminating in the Battle of Segesvár) and capitulated on August 13.

After quashing the revolution, Austria imposed a repressive regime on Hungary and ruled Transylvania directly through a military governor, with German as the official language. Austria abolished the Union of Three Nations and acknowledged the Romanians. Although the former serfs were given land by the Austrian authorities, it was often barely sufficient for subsistence living. These poor conditions caused many Romanian families to cross into Wallachia and Moldavia in search for better lives.

Romanian nationalists Sterca-Șuluțiu, Bariț, Bărnuțiu and Laurian demanded that the "other nations of Transylvania should call the Romanian nation Romanian, not oláh or walach". The 1849 Transylvanian national assembly accepted this demand.

Austro-Hungarian Empire 

Due to external and internal problems, reforms seemed inevitable to secure the integrity of the Habsburg Empire. Major Austrian military defeats (such as the 1866 Battle of Königgrätz) forced Austrian emperor Franz Joseph to concede internal reforms. To appease Hungarian separatism, the emperor made a deal with Hungary (the Austro-Hungarian Compromise of 1867, negotiated by Ferenc Deák) by which the dual monarchy of Austria–Hungary came into existence. The two realms were governed separately by two parliaments from two capitals, with a common monarch and common external and military policies. Economically, the empire was a customs union. The first prime minister of Hungary after the Compromise was Count Gyula Andrássy. The old Hungarian Constitution was restored, and Franz Joseph was crowned as King of Hungary. Romanian intellectuals issued the Blaj Pronouncement in protest of the Compromise.

The era saw considerable economic development, with the GNP per capita growing roughly 1.45 percent annually from 1870 to 1913. That level of growth compared favorably with that of other European nations, such as Britain (1.00 percent), France (1.06 percent), and Germany (1.51 percent). Technological growth accelerated industrialization and urbanization. Many state institutions and the modern administrative system of Hungary were established during this period. However, as a result of the Compromise the special status of Transylvania ended; it became a province under the Hungarian diet. While part of Austria-Hungary, Transylvania's Romanians were oppressed by the Hungarian administration through Magyarization; German Saxons were also subject to this policy.
During this time, Hungarian-administered Transylvania consisted of a 15-county region, covering 54,400 km2 in the southeast of the former Kingdom of Hungary. The Hungarian counties at the time were Alsó-Fehér, Beszterce-Naszód, Brassó, Csík, Fogaras, Háromszék, Hunyad, Kis-Küküllő, Kolozs, Maros-Torda, Nagy-Küküllő, Szeben, Szolnok-Doboka, Torda-Aranyos, and Udvarhely.

First World War 

At the outbreak of World War I, the Kingdom of Romania refused to join the Central Powers and remained neutral, although Kings Carol I and Ferdinand I were from the German Hohenzollern dynasty.

On 17 August 1916, Romania signed a secret treaty (the Treaty of Bucharest, 1916) with the Entente Powers (United Kingdom, France, Italy and Russia), according to which the Allies agreed that Transylvania, Banat, and Partium would become part of Romania after the War if it entered the war. Romania joined the Triple Entente after signing the treaty and declared war against the Central Powers on 27 August 1916. It crossed the Carpathian mountains into Transylvania, forcing the Central Powers to fight on another front. A German-Bulgarian counter-offensive began the following month in Dobruja and in the Carpathians, driving the Romanian army back into Romania by mid-October and eventually leading to the capture of Bucharest. The exit of Russia from the war in March 1918 with the Treaty of Brest-Litovsk left Romania alone in Eastern Europe, and a peace treaty between Romania and Germany was negotiated in May (the Treaty of Bucharest, 1918). By mid-1918 the Central Powers were losing the war on the Western Front, and the Austro-Hungarian empire had begun to disintegrate. Austria-Hungary signed a general armistice in Padua on 3 November 1918, and the nations inside Austria-Hungary proclaimed their independence from the empire during September and October of that year.

King Ferdinand's wife, Marie (who had British and Russian parentage) was highly influential during these years.

Interbellum 

In 1918, as a result of the German defeat in World War I the Austro-Hungarian monarchy collapsed. On October 31, the successful Aster Revolution in Budapest brought the left liberal, pro-Entente count Mihály Károlyi to power as prime minister of Hungary. Influenced by Woodrow Wilson's pacifism, Károlyi ordered the disarmament of Hungarian Army. The Károlyi government outlawed all Hungarian armed associations and proposals intending to defend the country.

The resulting Treaty of Bucharest, 1918 was denounced in October 1918 by the Romanian government, which then re-entered the war on the Allied side and advanced to the Mureș (Maros) river in Transylvania.

The leaders of Transylvania's Romanian National Party met and drafted a resolution invoking the right of self-determination (influenced by Woodrow Wilson's 14 points) for Transylvania's Romanian people, and proclaimed the unification of Transylvania with Romania. In November the Romanian National Central Council, representing all Romanians in Transylvania, notified the Budapest government that it would take control of twenty-three Transylvanian counties (and parts of three others) and requested a Hungarian response by November 2. The Hungarian government (after negotiations with the council) rejected the proposal, claiming that it failed to secure the rights of the ethnic Hungarian and German populations. In Gyulafehérvár (Alba Iulia) on December 1, the Great National Assembly of Alba Iulia passed a resolution calling for the unification of all Romanians in a single state. The National Council of Transylvanian Germans and the Council of the Danube Swabians from the Banat approved the proclamation on 8 January 1919. In response, the Hungarian General Assembly of Kolozsvár (Cluj) reaffirmed the loyalty of Hungarians from Transylvania to Hungary on December 22, 1918.

The Romanian Army, representing the Entente powers, entered Transylvania from the east on November 12, 1918. In December they entered southern Transylvania, crossed the demarcation line on the Maros (Mureș) river by mid-December and advanced to Kolozsvár (Cluj) and Máramarossziget (Sighet) after making a request to the Powers of Versailles to protect the Romanians in Transylvania. In February 1919, to prevent armed clashes between Romanian and withdrawing Hungarian troops, a neutral zone was created.

The prime minister of the newly proclaimed Republic of Hungary resigned in March 1919, refusing the territorial concessions (including Transylvania) demanded by the Entente. When the Communist Party of Hungary (led by Béla Kun) came to power in March 1919, it proclaimed the Hungarian Soviet Republic; after promising that Hungary would regain the lands under its control during the Austro-Hungarian Empire it attacked Czechoslovakia and Romania, leading to the Hungarian-Romanian War of 1919. The Hungarian army began an April 1919 offensive in Transylvania along the Someș (Szamos) and Maros rivers. A Romanian counter-offensive pushed forward to reach the Tisza River in May. Another Hungarian offensive in July penetrated 60 km into Romanian lines before a further Romanian counter-offensive led to the end of Hungarian Soviet Republic and after the occupation of Budapest. The Romanian army withdrew from Hungary between October 1919 and March 1920.

România Mare ("Great Romania") refers to the Romanian state between the First and Second World Wars. Romania reached its greatest territorial extent, uniting almost all historical Romanian lands (except Northern Maramureș, Western Banat and small areas of Partium and Crișana). Great Romania was an ideal of Romanian nationalism.

At the end of World War I the Deputies of Transylvanian Romanians declared the union of Transylvania with Romania in Alba Iulia on 1. December 1918.; Bessarabia, having declared independence from Russia in 1917 at the Conference of the Country (Sfatul Țării) which proclaimed the union with Romania and called in Romanian troops to protect the province from the Bolsheviks. The union of Bukovina and Bessarabia with Romania was ratified in 1920 by the Treaty of Versailles. Romania had also acquired Southern Dobrudja from Bulgaria as a result of its victory in the Second Balkan War in 1913. The Treaty of Trianon (4 June 1920) defined the new borders with Hungary, assigning Transylvania and parts of Banat, Crișana, and Maramureș to the Kingdom of Romania. King Ferdinand I of Romania and Queen Maria of Romania were crowned at Alba Iulia in 1922.

Contemporary history

Second World War and Communist period 

In August 1940, during the Second World War, the northern half of Transylvania (Northern Transylvania) was annexed to Hungary by the second Second Vienna Award, leaving Southern Transylvania to Romania. On March 19, 1944, following the occupation of Hungary by the Nazi German army through Operation Margarethe, Northern Transylvania came under German military occupation. After King Michael's Coup, Romania left the Axis and joined the Allies, and, as such, fought together with the Soviet Union's Red Army against Nazi Germany, regaining Northern Transylvania. The Second Vienna Award was voided by the Allied Commission through the Armistice Agreement with Romania (September 12, 1944) whose Article 19 stipulated the following:

The 1947 Treaty of Paris reaffirmed the borders between Romania and Hungary, as originally defined in Treaty of Trianon, 27 years earlier, thus confirming the return of Northern Transylvania to Romania. From 1947 to 1989, Transylvania, as the rest of Romania, was under a communist regime.

Post-Communist period 

Today, "Transylvania proper" is included within the Romanian counties (județe) of Alba, Bistrița-Năsăud, Brașov, Cluj, Covasna, Harghita, Hunedoara, Mureș, Sălaj and Sibiu. In addition to Transylvania proper, modern Transylvania includes parts of the Banat, Crișana and Maramureș; these regions are in the counties of Arad, Bihor, Caraș-Severin, Maramureș, Sălaj, Satu Mare and Timiș.

Demographics and historical research 

There is an ongoing scholarly debate between Hungarian and Romanian historians regarding the medieval population of Transylvania. While some Romanian historians claim continuous Romanian majority, Hungarian historians claim the continuous settlement of Romanians into the Kingdom of Hungary.

Historian Ioan-Aurel Pop estimates as many as 800,000 people living in Roman Dacia by the 3rd century, and doubts the newly formed province South of the Danube could have absorbed such a large population.

According to Jean W. Sedlar, it cannot be ascertained from any extant documentary evidence how many Vlachs may have resided in Transylvania in the 11th century. The actual number of persons belonging to nationalities is at best guesswork, the Vlachs may have comprised two-thirds of Transylvania's population in 1241 on the eve of the Mongol invasion. Hungarian and Romanian historians attempted to prove that their ancestors were the first who settled in Transylvania. Romanians regard themselves as descendants of the tribes of Dacia intermingles with Roman settlers who allegedly have resided continuously in Transylvania. Hungarians claim that the Vlach population entered Transylvania from the Balkans only in the 12th century, this argument is supported by the origin of some Transylvanian place names from the time of the great Slavic migrations and by several Balkan influences on the Romanian language.

In a letter from 1356 Pope Innocent VI streghtened a previous bull addressed to the prior of the Dominican Order of Hungary, where he was instructed to preach the crusade “against all the inhabitants of Transylvania, Bosnia and Slavonia, which are heretics” (contra omnes Transilvanos, Bosnenses et Sclavonie, qui heretici fuerint). Ioan-Aurel Pop argues that in the Pope's view, those regions were "heretical", term which also included Orthodox people, and as mark of those regions' overwhelming non-Hungarian majority.

According to an investigation based on place-names made by István Kniezsa, 511 villages of Transylvania and Banat appear in documents at the end of the 13th century; however, only 3 of them bore Romanian names. Around 1400 AD, 1757 villages are mentioned in documents, though only 76 (4.3%) of them had names of Romanian origin.

Historians Ioan Bolovan and Sorina-Paula Bolovan made multiple estimations about the population of Transylvania prior to the first census of 1869. Arguing that the Romanians were the majority of the population in 1288 at the first national assembly in Transylvania, in 1536 during the life of Nicolaus Olahus and Anton Verantius based on their works, in 1690 an absolute Romanian majority, that no significant demographic change happened between the Middle Ages and 1750 based on the Austrian fiscal conscription and that Romanians were still the majority in 1773 based on the words of Emperor Joseph II. Moreover, they disagree with the Hungarian histography about a massive migration of Romanians from Wallachia and Moldavia in Transylvania because such a massive demographic change cannot be found in the Austrian fiscal conscription of 1750, who tracked newcomers over the previous decades, and that the Austrian administration explained concerns about Transylvanian Romanians leaving for Wallachia and Moldavia, including Emperor Joseph II.

According to Vlad Georgescu, the Romanians were the majority of the population in 1437 during the Bobâlna revolt.

Pope Pius II (Aeneas Sylvius Piccolomini) affirmed in the 15th century in the book Europe that Transylvania "was populated in our age by three races: Germans, Székelys, and Vlachs", he also stated "you can find only a few men skilled in combat among the Transylvanians who do not know Hungarian".

Nicolaus Olahus, Primate of Hungary stated in the book Hungaria et Athila in 1536 that in Transylvania "Four nations of different origins live in it: Hungarians, Székelys, Saxons, and Vlachs" 

Based on Antun Vrančić's work (Expeditionis Solymani in Moldaviam et Transsylvaniam libri duo. De situ Transsylvaniae, Moldaviae et Transalpinae liber tertius), more estimations exist as the original text is translated/interpreted in a  different way, especially by Romanian and Hungarian scholars. According to Ioan-Aurel Pop's interpretations, Antun Vrančić wrote that Transylvania "is inhabited by three nations – Székelys, Hungarians and Saxons; I should also add the Romanians who – even though they easily equal the others in number – have no liberties, no nobility and no rights of their own, except for a small number living in the District of Hátszeg, where it is believed that the capital of Decebalus lay, and who were made nobles during the time of John Hunyadi, a native of that place, because they always took part tirelessly in the battles against the Turks", while according to Károly Nyárády R., the proper translation of the first part of the sentence would be: "...I should also add the Romanians who – even though they easily equal any of the others in number...". In fact, Romanian autonomies also existed in Fogaras, Temes and Máramaros.

According to George W. White, in 1600 the Romanian inhabitants were primarily peasants, comprising more than 60 percent of the population.

In Letopisețul Țării Moldovei (1642–1647), the Moldavian chronicler Grigore Ureche notices that "Transylvania is more spread out by Romanians than by Hungarians".

Around 1650, Vasile Lupu in a letter written to the Sultan attests that the number of Romanians are more than the one-third of the population.

Evliya Çelebi (1611–1682) was an Ottoman explorer who traveled through the territory of the Ottoman Empire and neighboring lands over a period of forty years, recording his commentary in a travelogue called the Seyahatnâme "Book of Travel". His trip to Hungary was between 1660 and 1666. The Transylvanian's state of development in the 17th century was so good, that it was an attraction to strangers longing for its territory. Evliya Çelebi writes this in his book that the Romanian serfs move en masse to Transylvania because of the extreme ruthlessness of the rulers of Romanian lands. The Romanians say there is justice, legal order, and low taxes in Transylvania.

In 1684, Miron Costin wrote in his work Istoria în versuri polone despre Ţara Moldovei şi Munteniei: "To this day, they (Romanians) are more numerous than Hungarians, starting from Bačka of the Serbs of Temes, all over the Mureș, in Hațeg, around Bălgrad, where the princes live, in the Olt country and all over Maramureș".

In 1702 Andreas Freyberger wrote: "the Romanians are spread throughout all Transylvania, even in Szekelyland, and the land of the seats of the Saxons. There is no village, no market, no suburb, that doesn't have its own Romanians."

According to an official estimates made by the Austrian administrative authority (Verwaltungsgericht) dating from 1712–1713, the ethnic distribution of the population in Transylvania is as follows: 47% Hungarians, 34% Romanians, 19%, Saxons.

In Benedek Jancsó's estimation there were 150,000 Hungarians (~30%), 100,000 Saxons (~20%) and 250,000 Romanians (~50%) out of 500,000 people in Transylvania at the beginning of the 18th century. Official censuses with information on Transylvania's ethnic composition have been conducted since the 18th century. On May 1, 1784, Joseph II called for a census of the empire, including Transylvania. The data were published in 1787; however, this census showed only the overall population.

According to Saxon pastor Stephan Ludwig Roth in 1842, "There is no need to declare a language as the official language of the country. For we already have a language of the land. It is not German, but neither is Hungarian, it is Romanian. No matter how much we, the nations represented in the Diet, twist and spin, we cannot change anything. This is the reality. This reality cannot be disputed. As soon as two citizens of different nationalities meet and neither knows the other's language, the Romanian language immediately serves them as interpreters. When you go on a trip, when you go to the marketplace, everyone knows the Romanian language. Before testing whether someone speaks German or the other Hungarian, the conversation begins in Romanian. You can't talk to the Romanian anyway, because he usually only speaks in his own language. It is explicable: in order to learn Hungarian or German, you need school courses; while you can learn the Romanian language on your own, on the street, in daily contact with people. The ease of her learning is not limited to the large number of Latin words, which this people adopted with the merger or with the Roman settlers and which we, the Transylvanians, are known for, due to our education in the Latin spirit of so far, but also by the fact that life itself puts us in daily contact with this numerous people. Today one word catches you, tomorrow another and after a while you notice that you can speak Romanian, without actually having learned it. Even if it is not so easy for someone to learn it, it is recommended to do it for a thousand different reasons. You want to talk to a Romanian, you have to use his language, if you do not want to hear an 'I do not know!' shrugged."

The first official census in Transylvania in which a distinction was made between nationalities (distinction made on the basis of mother tongue) was made by the Austro-Hungarian authorities in 1869, counting 59,0% Romanians, 24,9% Hungarians and 11,9% Germans out of a total population of 4.224.436	people.

For the period before this year there are only estimates of the proportions of various ethnic groups in Transylvania. Thus, Fényes Elek, a Hungarian statistician from the 19th century, estimated in 1842 that the population of Transylvania in the years 1830–1840 was composed of 62.3% Romanians and 23.3% Hungarians.

Between 1880 and 1910, the census system in Austria-Hungary was based on first language used for communication. Before 1880, Jews were counted as an ethnic group; later, they were counted according to their first language, and the majority (75.7%) of the Jewish population reported Hungarian as their primary language, so they were counted as ethnically Hungarian in the censuses.

The data recorded in all estimates and censuses is presented in the table below.

Coat of arms of Transylvania 

The first heraldic representations of Transylvania date from the 16th century. The Diet of 1659 codified the representation of the privileged nations (Unio Trium Nationum (Union of the Three Nations)) in Transylvania's coat of arms. It depicted a black eagle (Turul) on a blue background, representing the Hungarians, the Sun and the Moon representing the Székelys, and seven red towers on a yellow background representing the seven fortified cities of the Transylvanian Saxons. The flag and coat of arms of Transylvania were granted by Queen Maria Theresa in 1765, when she established a Grand Principality within the Habsburg monarchy.

In 1596, Levinus Hulsius created a coat of arms for Transylvania, consisting of a shield with a rising eagle in the upper field and seven hills with towers on top in the lower field. He published it in his work "Chronologia", issued in Nuremberg the same year. The seal from 1597 of Sigismund Báthory, Prince of Transylvania, reproduced the new coat of arms with some slight changes: in the upper field the eagle was flanked by a sun and a moon and in the lower field the hills were replaced by simple towers. The coat of arms of Sigismund Báthory beside the coat of arms of the Báthory family, included the Transylvanian, Wallachia and Moldavian coat of arms, he used the title Prince of Transylvania, Wallachia and Moldavia. A short-lived heraldic representation of Transylvania is found on the seal of Michael the Brave. Besides the Wallachian eagle and the Moldavian aurochs, Transylvania is represented by two lions holding a sword standing on seven hills. Hungarian Transylvanian princes used the symbols of the Transylvanian coat of arms usually with the Hungarian coat of arms since the 16th century because Transylvanian princes maintained their claims to the throne of the Kingdom of Hungary.

While neither symbol has official status in present-day Romania, the Transylvanian coat of arms is marshalled within the national Coat of arms of Romania, it was also a component of the Coat of arms of Hungary.

Historiography 
The history of Transylvania has been subject to disagreement between national narratives, especially those of Romania and Hungary. In November 2006, a Romanian newspaper reported on a project for a book on the history of Transylvania under the joint auspices of the Romanian Academy and the Hungarian Academy of Sciences.

See also 

 Prehistory of Transylvania
 The Ancient History of Transylvania
 History of Romania
 History of Cluj-Napoca
 History of Hungary
 Kingdom of Hungary in the Middle Ages
 List of Transylvanian rulers
 History of the Székely people
 Aftermath of World War I
 Austria-Hungary
 Celts in Transylvania
 Dacia
 Origin of the Romanians
 Transylvanian School
 ASTRA
 Avram Iancu

References

Further reading 

 History of Transylvania, Volume I-III (2001-2002) online
  Jókai, Mór. The golden age in Transylvania (1898) online
 Oțetea, Andrei and Andrew MacKenzie. A Concise history of Romania (1985) online

 

ro:Transilvania#Istoria Transilvaniei